Ceryx semicincta is a moth of the subfamily Arctiinae. It was described by George Hampson in 1895. It is found on Tenasserim, Malacca and Borneo.

References

Ceryx (moth)
Moths described in 1895